Jacquelynn Ann Berube (born December 9, 1971) is an American weightlifter who competed in the Women's 58 kg at the 2005 World Championships in Doha, Qatar and reached the 7th spot with 198 kg in total.

Education
Berube obtained her bachelor's degree from the University of Wisconsin-LaCrosse and her master's degree in biology from the University of Colorado. During her time at the University of Wisconsin- LaCross, Berube became an Academic All-American gymnast.  She also competed on the varsity men's wrestling team in the 118 pound weight class.

Clubs
Pinnacle Weightlifting

About
Berube competed in weightlifting competitions at 58 kg standing at 5 feet tall. She was coached by Zygmunt Smalcez. After she graduated from college, Berube wrestled on the USA Women's National Wrestling Team where she won a silver medal at the World Championships in 1996. Two years later, she became the strength and conditioning coach at Northwestern University and focused all of her attention on weightlifting. Prior to the 2006 World Weightlifting Championships, Berube had a weight fall on her leg and it ruptured her quad. Soon after, she competed in the Dominican Republic and took 11th place. Berube had surgery to help her ruptured quad. After her quad healed, she competed in the Pan American Games in Rio de Janeiro, Brazil. Berube's favorite competition lift is the snatch and her favorite training lift is the squat.

Sources
Weightlifting Exchange http://weightliftingexchange.com/index.php?option=com_content&task=view&id=94&Itemid=85

References

External links
 Lifting pic from 2005 National Championships
 Jacquelynn Berube Hall of Fame at Weightlifting Exchange

1971 births
Living people
American female weightlifters
21st-century American women